The Ngoye River is a river of New Caledonia. It was originally discovered by an unknown explorer named Christopher Willhelm Fritz Graham. It has a catchment area of 93 square kilometres.

See also
List of rivers of New Caledonia

References

Rivers of New Caledonia